Green function might refer to:

Green's function of a differential operator
Deligne–Lusztig theory (Green function) in the representation theory of finite groups of Lie type
Green's function (many-body theory) in many-body theory